Anthony DeCurtis (born June 25, 1951) is an American author and music critic, who has written for Rolling Stone, the New York Times, Relix and many other publications.

Career
DeCurtis is a contributing editor at Rolling Stone, where his work has appeared for more than thirty years. He holds a Ph.D in American literature from Indiana University and is a Distinguished Lecturer in the creative writing program at the University of Pennsylvania.
He collaborated with Clive Davis on Davis's autobiography, The Soundtrack of My Life, which was published by Simon and Schuster in February 2013 and rose to number two on the New York Times nonfiction best-seller list. He appears in Clive Davis: The Soundtrack of Our Lives, a documentary based on the book that will open the Tribeca Film Festival in April 2017. His biography of Lou Reed, titled Lou Reed: A Life, was published by Little, Brown on October 10, 2017.

DeCurtis's essay accompanying the 1988 Eric Clapton box set Crossroads won a Grammy in the "Best Album Notes" category, and on three occasions he has won ASCAP's Deems Taylor awards for excellence in writing about music. He has appeared as a commentator on MTV, VH1, the Today Show, and many other news and entertainment programs. In 1996 he served as the moderator on the VH1 show Four on the Floor and as editorial director for the channel's nonfiction programming. He has served as a member of the Rock and Roll Hall of Fame nominating committee for more than twenty years.

From 2006 through June 2008 he directed and helped design the arts-and-culture curriculum at the City University of New York Graduate School of Journalism. He was an editorial consultant and the primary interviewer for "Joan Baez: How Sweet the Sound," a documentary for PBS American Masters. DeCurtis appeared in the 2011 documentary Reggae Got Soul: The Story of Toots and the Maytals which was featured on BBC and described as “The untold story of one of the most influential artists ever to come out of Jamaica”. In 2015, DeCurtis joined the judging panel of the 14th annual Independent Music Awards to assist independent musicians' careers.

 He was also a judge for the 7th, 8th, 9th, 10th, 11th, 12th and 13th Independent Music Awards.

Works
 In Other Words: Artists Talk About Life and Work 	Milwaukee, WI : Leonard, 2005. , 
 Rocking My Life Away: Writing About Music and Other Matters , Durham : Duke University Press, 1998. , 
 Lou Reed : a life New York : Little, Brown and Company, 2017. ,

Editor
 Blues & Chaos: The Music Writing of Robert Palmer New York: Scribner, 2009. , 
 Rolling Stone Illustrated History of Rock & Roll Paw Prints 2008. , 
 Rolling Stone images of rock & roll Boston, Mass. ; London : Little, Brown and Company, 1995. , 
 Anthony DeCurtis; James Henke; Holly George-Warren; et al., Rolling Stone Album Guide. New York: Random House, 1992. ,

References

External links

1951 births
Living people
American music critics
American music journalists
University of Pennsylvania faculty
The New York Times writers
Indiana University alumni
Grammy Award winners